Elections to Staffordshire County Council took place on 6 May 2021 on the same day as district council elections in Cannock Chase and Tamworth and other local elections in England. All of the council's divisions were up for election, meaning a total of 62 councillors were elected.

The result was a second consecutive landslide victory for the Conservative Party which increased its majority on the council from 51 seats in 2017 up to 57 seats, out of a possible 62. The Labour Party lost six of its ten seats which was the party's worst result since the 2009 election when it had been left with three seats; Labour was left without any representation in five of the county's eight districts and boroughs. The remaining seat was won by an independent candidate who held her Stone Urban seat.

Background
The Conservative Party had held a majority of seats in Staffordshire County Council since 2009 when it had ended 28 consecutive years of Labour control.  The most recent election in Staffordshire had been the 2019 general election, in which all twelve Staffordshire constituencies were won by the Conservatives. The Conservatives were aiming to repeat the success of their general election victory and gain divisions formerly regarded as safe territory for Labour. Labour meanwhile were hoping to retain their ten seats and regain some ground lost to the Conservatives at the 2017 election. Smaller parties, including the Liberal Democrats and Green Party were targeting specific divisions in the hope of making inroads into areas held by the main parties. Reform UK, the Trade Unionist and Socialist Coalition and the Heritage Party fielded candidates for the first time at a Staffordshire County Council election, as did a new localist party founded in 2020, the Chase Community Independents Group.

Summary

Election result

|-

Council composition
Prior to the election, the composition of the council was:

After the election, the composition of the council was:

Division results
Results for individual divisions are shown below. They have been divided into their respective districts or boroughs and listed alphabetically. Vote share changes are based on the results achieved by parties in 2017 election when these seats were last contested.

District of Cannock Chase
(7 seats, 6 electoral divisions)

Borough of East Staffordshire
The Main issue in East Staffordshire was a plan to demolish Burton Library and put it into the Burton Market Hall

(8 seats, 8 electoral divisions)

^ David Brookes was the sitting councillor for the Uttoxeter Town division and previously left the Conservative Party to become an independent.

District of Lichfield
(8 seats, 8 electoral divisions)

Borough of Newcastle-under-Lyme
(9 seats, 9 electoral divisions)

District of South Staffordshire
(8 seats, 7 electoral divisions)

Borough of Stafford
(9 seats, 9 electoral divisions)

District of Staffordshire Moorlands
(7 seats, 7 electoral divisions)

Borough of Tamworth
(6 seats, 6 electoral divisions)

By-elections

Biddulph North

References 

Staffordshire
2021
2020s in Staffordshire